"Bury It" is a song by Scottish synth-pop band Chvrches from their second studio album, Every Open Eye (2015). A remix of the song featuring Paramore frontwoman Hayley Williams was released on 10 June 2016 as the album's fifth and final single. The remix is included on the extended edition of Every Open Eye. The studio version of the remix premiered on Annie Mac's BBC Radio 1 show on 9 June 2016.

Live performances
Chvrches and Williams first performed "Bury It" together at Marathon Music Works in Nashville, Tennessee, on 27 October 2015. On 8 March 2016, the two artists also performed the song together during the Parahoy! cruise, which sailed from Miami to Cozumel, Mexico.

Music video
A lyric video for the song was released on 9 June 2016. A fully animated music video, created by Jamie McKelvie and illustrated by Mighty Nice, premiered on 11 July 2016.

Charts

Release history

Notes

References

2015 songs
2016 singles
Animated music videos
Chvrches songs
Hayley Williams songs
Songs written by Iain Cook
Songs written by Lauren Mayberry
Songs written by Martin Doherty
Virgin EMI Records singles